The  is the current annual playoff system implemented by Japan's Nippon Professional Baseball (NPB). It determines which team from the Central League (CL) and from the Pacific League (PL) will advance to compete for the championship in the Japan Series. After the creation of the NPB's two-league system in 1950, the PL experimented with three different playoff systems. In 2004, it implemented the postseason structure from which the Climax Series is based. After three seasons, the CL adopted the same system in 2007, creating the current, unified playoff format.

Both leagues play a regular season, after which the top three teams in each league compete against one another in a two-stage playoff. In the first stage, the teams that finish the regular season with the second- and third-best records play one another in a best-of-three series. The winners of these three-game series advance to the final stage to face each league's regular-season champion in a six-game series, which the regular-season champion starts with a one-game advantage. The winners of each league's final stage series compete against one another in that year's Japan Series.

History
Since the creation of the Nippon Professional Baseball's (NPB) two-league system, the regular-season winner of the Central League (CL) had always advanced to the Japan Series, where it competed against the Pacific League (PL) champion. The PL used the same system until 1973, when the league created NPB's only postseason play prior to 2004 (other than the Japan Series). This new system matched the team with the season's best first-half record against the team with the best second-half record. The winner of this best-of-five series advanced to the Japan Series, where they played against the CL champion. This system proved problematic when the Hankyu Braves won both the first and second halves of the 1976 and 1978 seasons, making a playoff series unnecessary. It was eliminated after the 1982 season, and instead the PL announced the following season that the first- and second-place teams would compete in a best-of-five playoff series after the 130-game regular season if five or fewer games separated the two teams. Unpopular with most baseball media and fans, the idea was scrapped after three seasons with a series never needing to be played. The two leagues returned to sending the team with the best regular season record in their respective league to compete against each other in the championship series.

Pacific League playoffs

In February 2003, the Pacific League board of directors agreed to reintroduce a playoff system to be used for the 2004 NPB season. If a first-place team had a substantial lead in the standings nearing the end of the regular season, the league's champion would have been decided and there was little excitement until the start of the Japan Series. The decision to add a PL playoff was an attempt to rectify this problem and increase the league's popularity. The new postseason plan initiated a two-stage playoff in which the top three PL teams competed. In the first stage, the teams that finished the newly shortened, 135-game regular season with the second- and third-best records played each other in a best-of-three series. The winner of this series faced the league's top finisher in the second, final stage. The second stage winner advanced to the Japan Series, where they competed against the CL's Climax Series champion team.

Originally, the top finisher in the league at the end of the season was only supposed to receive home-field advantage throughout the second stage, but in August 2003, PL officials announced that if the first-place team led the second-place team by more than five games at the end of the regular season, that team would also receive a one-game winning advantage in the second stage's best-of-five series. For the 2006 Pacific League Playoffs, PL officials removed the five-game lead requirement in favor of automatically awarding the first-place team the one-win advantage. In conjunction with this change, the first-place team no longer had home-field advantage for the entirety of the second stage; instead, the remaining four games were to be split evenly between both teams' stadiums. This rule change became a non-factor after the eventual first-place Hokkaido Nippon-Ham Fighters clinched a Japan Series berth in two straight games.

During the three years of the PL's playoff system, the winner of the PL's postseason tournament competed against the CL team who finished the regular season with the best record. The disparity between the two leagues' postseasons provoked some criticism from baseball analysts and insiders. During the 2005 Japan Series, The Japan Times Stephen Ellsesser called NPB's unbalanced postseason a "bad system" and believed that the CL's decision to not implement a playoff system of their own was "foolish". Citing the Hanshin Tigers' poor Japan Series performance, he speculated that the CL's lack of postseason play was a disadvantage. Ellsesser believed that the 17 days between their last regular-season game and the first Japan Series game did nothing to prepare the Tigers for the eventual championship series against the Chiba Lotte Marines, who had played continuously. Like Ellsesser, after seeing the "excitement" that the 2004 PL Playoffs caused, then-Marines manager Bobby Valentine was "incredulous that the Central League didn’t follow suit" and create a playoff series of their own.

Climax Series creation

The Central League had situational playoff scenarios written into its bylaws that required either a tie in the standings or a team with more wins finishing with a worse winning percentage than the top team, but a permanent playoff plan had never been created. In March 2006, encouraged by the success of the PL's playoff series, CL officials announced their intention to introduce postseason playoffs for the 2007 season to help boost declining attendance. During meetings held later that year, PL and CL officials disagreed over proposed plans detailing the new playoff system. Since the creation of the PL playoffs in 2004, the league awarded its pennant titles to the playoff winners rather than the team who finished the regular season with the best record. The PL disapproved of the CL's intentions to continue awarding their league title to the first-place finisher in the regular season while using the playoffs to determine which team would compete against in the Japan Series.

In September 2006, both leagues agreed on a unified postseason system. The CL implemented a playoff system identical to the PL's, and the entire playoff series was dubbed the "Climax Series". The PL agreed to name the regular season first-place finishers league champions rather than the team that won the leagues' respective playoffs—a reversal from the previous three seasons. It was decided that both leagues would play 144 regular-season games, the first time both leagues would play the same number of games since the PL introduced its playoff system in 2004. The two leagues also agreed that neither regular-season champion should receive a one-game advantage in the final stage of the Climax Series, claiming that it was unnecessary from a business point of view. It had been suggested that the Yomiuri Giants voted to approve the playoff idea in 2006 because they had not finished atop the standings in the regular season since 2002 and the playoff concept would increase the Giants' chances of winning the Japan Series. However, the plan backfired on them. In the Climax Series' inaugural season, the Giants finally won the CL pennant but were still denied a Japan Series berth when they were defeated by the second-place Chunichi Dragons in a three-game sweep during the final stage of the 2007 Central League Climax Series. The next season, the leagues overturned their decision on the final stage advantage and agreed to award their champions an automatic one-win advantage in the final stage starting with the 2008 Climax Series. At the same time, the final stage changed from a best-of-five series and became a best-of-seven series, where the first team to accumulate four wins advances to the Japan Series.

The 2020 season, shortened to 120 games because of the COVID-19 pandemic, featured a modified Climax Series. The PL Climax Series had the season's top-two seeded teams play a best-of-five series, with the league's champion still being awarded the automatic one-win advantage. The CL forwent a playoff series completely, instead advancing their league champion directly to the Japan Series. The CL's decision to eliminate their Climax Series was due in part to just two of the league's six teams regularly playing in domed stadiums, making it unclear how many games would need to be made-up at the end of the season due to potential rainouts.

Current format
Both leagues employ the same postseason format, with the top three teams from each league participating in their own two-stage playoff. Teams are ranked via their regular-season winning percentage. If teams finish with the same winning percentage, the following criteria are used to rank them:

Central League
1. The team with the higher number of wins advances
2. The team with the higher winning percentage in head-to-head games advances
3. The team with the higher ranking the previous season advances

Pacific League
1. The team with the higher winning percentage in head-to-head games advances
2. The team with the higher winning percentage in regular-season games excluding interleague games advances
3. The team with the higher ranking the previous season advances

The first stage is a best-of-three series involving the regular season's second- and third-place finishers, with all games played at the second-place team's home field. The winner of this series goes on to face the league's pennant-winner in the final stage. This series is best-of-six. The league champion is awarded a one-win advantage as well as home field advantage for the entire series, unlike most professional leagues where a 5-game playoff series runs 2-2-1 or 2-3 or a 7-game playoff series that runs 2-3-2 with the higher seed receiving the extra game. The winning teams advance to the Japan Series, where they compete against one another. Unlike MLB, NPB games may end in a tie if there is no winner after 12 innings of play. If a Climax Series game results in a tie, the win is credited to neither team. If this causes the series to end in a tie, the higher-seeded team advances.

Results
The league champions were knocked out of the Climax Series and therefore didn't advance to the Japan Series six times total, three times in each the PL and CL.

 The team won the stage.
BOLD: The team went on to win the Japan Series.
 The inaugural 2007 second stage was a best-of-five series that did not award the league champion with a one-win advantage.
 Due to ongoing offseason renovations at Koshien Stadium, the Hanshin Tigers' home stadium, the 2008 first stage games were instead played at Kyocera Dome Osaka.

 The team won the stage.
BOLD: The team went on to win the Japan Series.
 The inaugural 2007 second stage was a best-of-five series that did not award the league champion with a one-win advantage.
 Instead of hosting the first game of the 2008 second stage at Seibu Dome, the Saitama Seibu Lions' home stadium, they instead held it at Omiya Park Baseball Stadium, a smaller, Saitama-based stadium.
 Due to the COVID-19 pandemic, the 2020 final stage was reduced to a best-of-five series, with the league champion receiving an automatic one-win advantage.

Reception and criticism
After being implemented for the 2007 season, the Climax Series drew mixed reviews. The implementation of a unified playoff system in NPB was welcomed by some. Robert Whiting described its creation as "long overdue" and believes it stimulates more interest in Japanese baseball. Japanese baseball writer Asa Satoshi explains that while the system isn't perfect, it reduces the number of throwaway dead rubber games played and its need is reinforced by its popularity with fans. However, Satoshi goes on to question the decision to award the league pennant to the team with the highest winning percentage instead of its Climax Series champion. The decision leads to scenarios where a team can be named the best team in Japan after winning the Japan Series, however at the same time the team wasn't crowned the best team in their respective league. Furthermore, the system allows for teams with sub-.500 winning percentages to qualify for the Climax Series. Satoshi proposes the hypothetical situation in which a team that won less than 50% of their regular-season games wins a Japan Series title and questions if that team could be rightfully named the best in Japan. Others, however, believe that the Climax Series is wholly unnecessary. Former NPB player and coach Katsumi Hirosawa believes that it is unreasonable for a team that overwhelmingly won the regular season to be defeated in the Climax Series, even if that defeat generates excitement. He also argues that a system that allows for half of the teams to advance to the playoffs and potentially win the Japan Series undermines the purpose of a long regular season.

Various other details in how the system operates has been debated and criticized. The tiebreaker that determines which team moves on to the Climax Series in the event that two teams end the regular season with the same record has also drawn criticism. Currently, the team that finished higher in the league standings the previous season holds an advantage. This contrasts with Major League Baseball (MLB), which employs a one-game playoff (if only one team advances), or other professional leagues that may use head-to-head season records (and further tiebreakers such as non-interleague play records, second half records, et al.). Former Hiroshima Carp bench coach Jeff Livesey explained that in one instance his team was actually a full game further behind the Hanshin Tigers than the standings showed because unlike the Tigers, the Carp could not enter the Climax Series in the event of a tie. Former player Scott McClain believes that "[the tiebreaker] should have nothing to do with last year", pointing out that players and managers change from year to year. The Japan Times columnist Wayne Graczyk has suggested that this format be scrapped in favor of MLB's one-game playoff.

The most scrutinized aspect of the Climax Series is the one-game advantage that is awarded to the regular-season champions for the final stage. When the rule was implemented the for the 2008 Climax Series, many players reacted negatively with some describing the rule as "unfair", "bad", "bull" and "messed up". Former player and current manager Alex Ramírez, however, believed that the league champion deserves the advantage. The Japan Times columnist Jason Coskrey believes that the "phantom win" gives the pennant winner too much of an advantage. According to him, the first stage bye plus all home games during the final stage should be advantage enough for the top-seeded team. He describes the situation as NPB "trying to have its cake and eat it too" by trying to reap the benefits of a playoff system while also trying to maintain the traditional showdown of pennant winners in the Japan Series. Looking back over the first ten years of the Climax Series, Satoshi believed that it was an ideal form postseason entertainment. Through that time, the league champion won the Climax Series and advanced to the Japan Series almost 82% of the time. He believed this to be the right balance as it maintained the importance of the regular season while also allowing for an occasional surprise that excited fans.

In 2017, the system again drew criticism, this time for allowing games to be called early because of weather and treating them as official games (postseason games in North America's Major League Baseball since 2009 must be played to the full nine innings). After the Yokohama DeNA BayStars lost a 5-inning game in the 2017 Central League Climax Series, Coskrey wrote that playoff games should never end in that manner. He suggested that NPB could have easily suspended the game and resumed where it left off the next day or even postponed the game entirely until the next day. Similarly, in an article for Yahoo Sports, Craig Calcaterra called the Climax Series "super unfair" after the incident and imagined a similar hypothetical situation in the MLB playoffs and concluded that fans would "riot".

See also
 Major League Baseball postseason

References

Notes

Citations

 
Recurring sporting events established in 2007